Damián Ezequiel Petcoff Kailer (born 24 May 1990) is an Argentine footballer who plays for Spanish club UD Logroñés as a midfielder.

Football career
Petcoff started his career with hometown side Boca Juniors, joining the club's youth categories in 2000 at the age of ten. Four years later he moved abroad, joining Real Betis and finishing his formation with the club. He appeared with the B-team for four seasons, and in 2012 summer signed a contract with Segunda División side Córdoba CF.

Petcoff made his professional debut on 12 September 2012, coming on as a second-half substitute for Pepe Díaz in a 1–0 Copa del Rey home win against Elche CF. He made his league debut on 11 November, replacing Fede Vico in a 5–3 away defeat of SD Ponferradina.

In January 2013, after being rarely used, Petcoff was loaned to Real Jaén in the third level. In July, after achieving promotion, the loan was renewed to a further season, but he only appeared in 102 minutes of action (only 58 in the league) during the whole campaign, which ended in relegation.

Upon returning to the Blanquiverdes, Petcoff was assigned to the reserves in division three, and terminated his contract on 10 August 2015. He continued to appear in the category in the following years, representing CD Eldense, Marbella FC, Valencia CF Mestalla, CD Badajoz, Gimnàstic de Tarragona and UD Logroñés.

References

External links

1990 births
Living people
Footballers from Buenos Aires
Argentine footballers
Association football midfielders
Segunda División players
Segunda División B players
Betis Deportivo Balompié footballers
Córdoba CF players
Real Jaén footballers
Córdoba CF B players
CD Eldense footballers
Marbella FC players
Valencia CF Mestalla footballers
CD Badajoz players
Gimnàstic de Tarragona footballers
UD Logroñés players
Argentine expatriate footballers
Argentine expatriate sportspeople in Spain
Expatriate footballers in Spain